John Miller (born 5 July 1946) is a British historian of the seventeenth century. He was a professor at Queen Mary University of London.

Works

Books
Popery and Politics in England 1660–1688 (Cambridge: Cambridge University Press, 1973). 
The Life and Times of William and Mary (London: Weidenfeld and Nicolson, 1974). 
James II: A Study in Kingship (London: Wayland Publishers, 1978; Methuen, 2nd ed. 1989). , 
The Glorious Revolution (London: Longman, 1983; 2nd ed. 1997). , 
Restoration England: The Reign of Charles II (London: Longman Higher Education, 1985). 
Religion in the Popular Prints 1600–1832 (Cambridge: Chadwick-Healey, 1986). 
Bourbon and Stuart: Kings and Kingship in France and England in the Seventeenth Century (London: Franklin Watts, 1987). 
Seeds of Liberty: 1688 and the Shaping of Modern Britain (London: Souvenir Press, 1988). 
Absolutism in Seventeenth Century Europe, ed. John Miller (Basingstoke: Palgrave Macmillan, 1990). 
Charles II (London: Weidenfeld and Nicolson, 1991). 
An English Absolutism? The Later Stuart Monarchy 1660–88 (The Historical Association, 1993). 
After the Civil Wars: English Politics and Government in the Reign of Charles II (London: Longman, 2000). 
The Stuarts (London: Hambledon Continuum, 2003). 
Cities Divided: Politics and Religion in English Provincial Towns 1660–1722 (Oxford: Oxford University Press, 2007). 
A Brief History of the English Civil Wars (Brief Histories): Roundheads, Cavaliers and the Execution of the King (London: Robinson, 2009). 
Early Modern Britain 1450–1750 (Cambridge: Cambridge University Press, 2017).

Articles
'The Earl of Tyrconnel and James II's Irish Policy, 1685–1688', The Historical Journal, Vol. 20, No. 4 (December 1977), pp. 803-823.
'The Potential for ‘Absolutism’ in Later Stuart England', History, Vol. 69, No. 226 (1984), pp. 187-207.
'The Crown and the Borough Charters in the Reign of Charles II', The English Historical Review, Vol. 100, No. 394 (January 1985), pp. 53-84.
'Public Opinion in Charles II's England', History, Vol. 80, No. 260 (October 1995), pp. 359-381.
'A Moderate in the First Age of Party: The Dilemmas of Sir John Holland, 1675–85', The English Historical Review, Vol. 114, No. 458 (September 1999), pp. 844-874.
'‘A Suffering People’: English Quakers and Their Neighbours c. 1650–c. 1700', Past & Present, No. 188 (August 2005), pp. 71-103.
'Containing Division in Restoration Norwich', The English Historical Review, Vol. 121, No. 493 (September 2006), pp. 1019-1047.

Notes

1946 births
Living people
20th-century British historians
Academics of Queen Mary University of London